The Promised Day Brigade (abbreviated PDB), originally called the Muqawimun ("Resisters"), was a Shi'a organization and was an insurgent group operating in Iraq during the war. In 2010, it was one of the largest and most powerful of what the US military call "Special Groups" in Iraq.

The group was created as successor to Muqtada al-Sadr's Mahdi Army, which was Iraq's largest Shi'a militia until its disbanding in 2008, he also called on other Special Groups to join the brigade. Sadr had earlier already talked about the creation of a smaller guerrilla unit which would continue the Mahdi Army's armed activities but for the first time gave the organisation a name in November 2008 when he declared the creation of the Promised Day Brigade. Its activities have particularly increased since May 2009. The group's name is in reference to an alternate term for the Islamic Day of Judgment. The group is alleged to receive Iranian support. A crackdown against the group, in the end 2009, led to the arrest of 18 of its members including several commanders. On November 29, 2009, the group's Basra leader was arrested in al-Amarah.

In October 2009, the Promised Day Brigade fought a battle with rival Special Group Asa'ib Ahl al-Haq for influence in Sadr City. The Promised Day Brigade reportedly won the battle and even managed to destroy the house of Abdul Hadi al-Darraji, a senior Asa'ib Ahl al-Haq leader. Since then, the PDB has been the most powerful Special Group in the ex-Mahdi Army stronghold of Sadr City and has increased its activity there.

On July 21, 2010, General Ray Odierno said Iran supports three Shiite groups in Iraq that had attempted to attack US bases: US officials believe that of these three groups, the Promised Day Brigades poses the greatest threat to Iraq's long-term security.

 the Promised Day Brigades
 Ketaib Hezbollah (Hezbollah Brigades)
 Asaib Ahl al-Haq (League of the Righteous)

See also
 List of armed groups in the Syrian Civil War

References

Arab militant groups
Anti-ISIL factions in Iraq
Anti-ISIL factions in Syria
Factions in the Iraq War
Iraqi insurgency (2003–2011)
Paramilitary forces of Iraq
Pro-government factions of the Syrian civil war
Rebel groups in Iraq
Resistance movements
Shia organizations
Sadr City
Organizations designated as terrorist by the United Arab Emirates
Organizations based in Asia designated as terrorist
Jihadist groups in Iraq
Axis of Resistance